Louis Ost Jr. (March 8, 1893 – July 11, 1960) was an American football coach.  He served as the head football coach at Hillsdale College in Hillsdale, Michigan for one season, in 1922, compiling a record of 3–5.  Ost was also the head basketball coach at Hillsdale for one season, in 1922–23, tallying a mark of 7–13.

Ost married Blossom Stewart on December 15, 1922 in Hillsdale. He died in 1960.

Head coaching record

Football

References

External links
 

1893 births
1960 deaths
Hillsdale Chargers football coaches
Hillsdale Chargers men's basketball coaches
Sportspeople from Newark, New Jersey
Coaches of American football from New Jersey
Basketball coaches from New Jersey